Loricariichthys rostratus is a species of catfish in the family Loricariidae. It is native to South America, where it occurs in the Paraná River basin in Argentina, Brazil, and Paraguay, with its type locality being designated as the Itaipu Dam's reservoir. The species reaches 27.5 cm (10.8 inches) in standard length and is believed to be a facultative air-breather.

References

Further reading
Gubiani, Éder André, et al. "Variations in fish assemblages in a tributary of the upper Paraná River, Brazil: A comparison between pre and post‐closure phases of dams." River Research and Applications 26.7 (2010): 848–865.
Gubiani, Éder André, et al. "Fish, Piquiri River, Upper Paraná River Basin, Paraná State, Brazil." Check List 2.3 (2006): 9-14.
Oliveira, E. F., Erivelto Goulart, and Carolina Viviana Minte-Vera. "Patterns of dominance and rarity of fish assemblage along spatial gradients in the Itaipu reservoir, Paraná, Brazil." Acta Scientiarum Biological Sciences 25.1 (2003): 71–78.

External links

FishBase

Loricariini
Catfish of South America
Taxa named by Roberto Esser dos Reis
Taxa named by Edson H.L. Pereira
Fish described in 2000
Fish of Argentina
Fish of Brazil
Fish of Paraguay
Taxobox binomials not recognized by IUCN